The Hispar Valley is the last Valley of Nagar region in Gilgit-Baltistan, Pakistan. The valley is located two kilometers below the snout of the 49 kilometer-long Hispar Glacier. It is about 28 km away from Nagar Khas and 25 km away from Hoper Valley. It can be reached from the Karakoram Highway by the road that leads towards Nagar and Hopar Valley. The Hispar valley links the Nagar District to the Shigar District via Hispar Pass at the altitude of 16,824 ft.

Peaks, glaciers and mountain passes

Peaks
 Golden Peak
 Miar Peak
 Malubiting
 Hispar Sar

Glaciers
 Hispar Glacier
 Biafo Glacier

Mountain passes
 Hispar Pass

Valleys nearby
Hoper Valley
Nagarkhas
Nagar Valley
Sumayar Valley
Hunza Valley

See also
 Biafo Glacier
 State of Nagar

References

Valleys of Gilgit-Baltistan
Nagar District
Geography of Gilgit-Baltistan